Sudan has competed at several editions of the African Games.

The country did not win a medal at the 2019 African Games.

Medal record

References